Agri SA (Agri South Africa) is the biggest agricultural organisations in South Africa established in 1904 and consists of provincial affiliates, commodity organisations and corporate members. 

 Agriculture
Farmers' organizations
 Agricultural organisations based in South Africa